Channel North was a free to air public channel in Whangarei, New Zealand.

The channel was owned by the Northland TV Charitable Trust a not-for-profit community group.
On 1 December 2011 Channel North was broadcasting digital signals on the Freeview|HD platform.
On 31 August 2017 Channel North stopped broadcasting on Freeview|HD  and became an online-only channel.

See also 
 List of New Zealand television channels

External links 
 Official Website   
 Northland TV Charitable Trust

English-language television stations in New Zealand
Mass media in Whangārei